The Mount Nimba screeching frog (Arthroleptis nimbaensis) is a species of frog in the family Arthroleptidae. It is endemic to Mount Richard-Molard (Mount Nimba) in Guinea, from forests at elevations of 650 to 1,250 m. It is threatened by habitat degradation from mining activities.

References

nimbaensis
Frogs of Africa
Amphibians of West Africa
Endemic fauna of Guinea
Amphibians described in 1950
Taxa named by Fernand Angel
Taxonomy articles created by Polbot